Maraz Hossain Opi (born 10 March 2001) is a Bangladeshi professional footballer who plays as an attacking midfielder for Bangladesh Premier League club Abahani Limited Dhaka and the Bangladesh national football team.

International career

Youth
While studying at BKSP, Bangladesh U18 head coach at the time Peter Turner included Maraz in the squad for the 2019 SAFF U-18 Championship in Nepal. On 27 September 2019, Maraz scored for the U18 team as they trashed Bhutan 4-0 to reach the finals of the tournament. 

The following year, Peter Turner who was in charge of the Bangladesh U19 selected Maraz for the 2020 AFC U-19 Championship qualifiers, where Bangladesh failed to win a single game and even suffered a defeat at the hands of Bhutan.

In September 2021, interim appointed Maruful Haque named Maraz in his squad for the 2022 AFC U-23 Asian Cup qualifiers. After less than a months training, the team produced frustrating results at they conceded a total of 11 goals during the three matches played. Maraz started all three games for the team throughout the qualifiers.

Senior
Maraz was called up to a 30 member preliminary team by Jamie Day before the 2021 SAFF Championship. However, after Days's dismissal only a month before the tournament, interim coach Óscar Bruzón did not keep him in the final squad.

On 24 March 2022, Maraz made his debut for the Bangladesh national football team, coming on as a substitute for Biplu Ahmed in the 87th minute against Maldives. Bangladesh ended up losing the friendly 2-0.

Career statistics

Club 

Notes

International

International goals

Bangladesh U18

References

External links
 

Living people
2001 births
Bangladeshi footballers
Bangladesh international footballers
Bangladesh youth international footballers
Association football midfielders
Abahani Limited (Dhaka) players
Saif SC players
People from Gazipur District
Bangladesh Football Premier League players